Severo-Eniseysk Airport  is an airport in Krasnoyarsk Krai, Russia, located  southwest of Severo-Eniseysk. It features a well-maintained concrete runway servicing small transports and passenger flights from Krasnoyarsk.

Airlines and destinations

References
RussianAirFields.com

Airports built in the Soviet Union
Airports in Krasnoyarsk Krai